

The Ennomini are a tribe of geometer moths in the Ennominae subfamily. They are large-bodied and rather nondescript Ennominae, overall showing many similarities to the closely related Azelinini and Nacophorini.

Most have a beige to brown color, and they rarely possess the disruptive cryptic patterns seen in many other geometer moths. A typical ennomiine wing pattern consists of two or three costal to dorsal sections, one of which is often darker in color. There is rarely more than one conspicuous dark or light spot on each side of each wing, and many do not have any particularly prominent markings at all.

Systematics
Phaeoura, which includes Phaeoura quernaria – the type species of the Nacophorini – nowadays, appears to be closer to the Ennomini than to the bulk of genera currently placed in the Nacophorini. It might be moved into the present tribe, making Nacophorini a junior synonym of Ennomini. The Lithinini and perhaps the Campaeini too, on the other hand, seem to warrant merging with the bulk of the Nacophorini, and in that case the resulting group would probably be named Lithinini. On the other hand, a more radical approach to achieve monophyly would be to merge all three tribes into the Ennomini. The enigmatic genus Hoplosauris, of rather uncertain placement in the Ennominae, is in some respects intermediate between the Nacophorini and the Ennomini.

Selected genera and species
As numerous ennomine genera have not yet been assigned to a tribe, the genus list is preliminary.
 Acrodontis - might belong in Boarmiini
 Apeira
 Artiora
 Crocallis
 Scalloped oak, Crocallis elinguaria
 Devenilia
 Ectephrina
 Eilicrinia
 Ennomos
 Canary-shouldered thorn, Ennomos alniaria
 Large thorn, Ennomos autumnaria
 September thorn, Ennomos erosaria
 August thorn, Ennomos quercinaria
 Exangerona
 Hoplosauris (tentatively placed here)
 Lignyoptera
 Ocoelophora
 Odontopera
 Scalloped hazel, Odontopera bidentata
 Pachycnemia
 Proteostrenia
 Scionomia
 Selenia
 Purple thorn, Selenia tetralunaria
 Seleniopsis
 Scodiomima
 Xerodes - might belong in Boarmiini

Footnotes

References

  (2008): Family group names in Geometridae. Retrieved 2008-JUL-22.
  (2007): Butterflies and Moths of the World, Generic Names and their Type-species - Nacophora. Retrieved 2008-JUL-22.
  (2008): Markku Savela's Lepidoptera and some other life forms: Ennominae. Version of 2008-MAR-08. Retrieved 2008-JUL-21.
  (2008): Characterisation of the Australian Nacophorini using adult morphology, and phylogeny of the Geometridae based on morphological characters. Zootaxa 1736: 1-141. PDF abstract and excerpt

 
Insect tribes